The 2016 FIBA Asia Challenge was the 6th FIBA Asia Challenge, an international basketball tournament of FIBA Asia which was hosted by Iran from 9–18 September 2016. This tournament served as the first step in determining the process of the qualifiers for the 2017 FIBA Asia Cup which will feature teams from both FIBA Asia and FIBA Oceania for the first time. Iran are the defending champion from 2014.

The top five teams earned their respective sub-confederations an extra berth for the 2017 FIBA Asia Cup which is formerly named as the FIBA Asia Championship. The 2017 tournament is not an edition of the FIBA Asia Challenge, which was formerly named as FIBA Asia Cup until 2014.

Qualification 

According to the FIBA Asia rules, the number of participating teams in the 2016 FIBA Asia Challenge is twelve. Each zone had one place, and the hosts (Iran) and the defending FIBA Asia Championship titleholder (China) were automatically qualified. The other two places were allocated to the zones according to performance in the 2015 FIBA Asia Championship; as a result, Southeast Asia and West Asia zones were allocated an additional berth each.

In the event of a withdrawal or non-participation by qualified teams, FIBA Asia has the right to invite other teams, while endeavoring to maintain, as far as possible, a certain balance between sub-zones.

Included are teams' FIBA World Ranking prior to the tournament.

Venue
The Azadi Indoor Stadium, also known as the Twelve Thousand People Sport Hall was the venue of competition. However quarterfinals matches were held in Azadi Basketball Hall due to Tehran Derby.

Draw
The results of the draw for the competition was announced on August 14, 2016.

Squads

Preliminary round
All teams advanced to the second round.

All times are local (UTC+4:30).

Group A

Group B

Group C

Group D

Second round

Group E

Group F

Final round

Quarterfinals

Classification 5th–8th

Semifinals

Seventh place game

Fifth place game

Third place game

Final

Final rankings

Awards 

 Most Valuable Player –  Hamed Haddadi
 PG –  Kim Sun-hyung
 SG –  Dar Tucker
 SF –  Mohammad Jamshidi
 PF –  Kevin Galloway
 C –  Hamed Haddadi

References

 
2016
2016–17 in Asian basketball
2016–17 in Iranian basketball
International basketball competitions hosted by Iran
Sport in Tehran
September 2016 sports events in Asia